Philippine language may refer to:
 the Filipino language, a standardized register of the Tagalog language and national language of the Philippines
 one of the languages of the Philippines
 one of the Philippine languages, a linguistic grouping

See also
 Proto-Philippine language